Daniel Pearce may refer to:
 Daniel Pearce (chartered surveyor), British businessman (born 1933)
 Daniel Pearce (musician, born 1978), English singer-songwriter
 Daniel Pearce, better known as Eats Everything, English DJ and record producer (born 1980)
 Daniel Pearce (footballer), Australian rules footballer (born 1993)